Umesh Damdor Valjee,  (born 30 September 1969 in Durban, KwaZulu-Natal) is a South African-born English deaf cricketer. He is a BSL user.

He is a right-handed batsman and very occasional right-arm medium pacer. Valjee came into professional cricket after being signed to British Deaf Sports Council in 1989. He is the longest-serving deaf cricketer of England, and wear same number shirt (No. 1) as was worn by Tom Armitage—the first capped England player.

Valjee is former captain of the England national deaf cricket team, and was awarded with the England Disability Cricketer of the Year in 2011. He was also awarded an MBE in the 2011 New Year's Honours list for services to disabled sport.

He was one of the torchbearers at the 2012 Summer Olympics in London.

Valjee played Jamil in the BBC's series "Switch" (2001-2006), which featured deaf signing actors.

References

External links
England Cricket Association for the Deaf

1969 births
Living people
BSL users
Cricketers from Durban
Deaf cricketers
South African deaf people
English cricketers of the 21st century
English people of Indian descent
British sportspeople of Indian descent
British Asian cricketers
Members of the Order of the British Empire
Middlesex cricketers
South African emigrants to the United Kingdom
South African people of Indian descent